Levally may refer to the following places in Ireland:

Levally Lough, lough in County Mayo, Republic of Ireland
Levally Lower, townland in County Fermanagh, Northern Ireland